The Arch of Septimius Severus may refer to:
 Arch of Septimius Severus in Rome, Italy
 Arch of Septimius Severus (Leptis Magna) in Leptis Magna, Italy
 Arch of Septimius Severus (Thugga) in Thugga, Tunisia

 Monumental Arch of Palmyra in Palmyra, Syria.